Charles Walter Wall (21 June 1895 – 25 August 1965) was an Australian rules footballer who played with Collingwood in the Victorian Football League (VFL).

Notes

External links 

Charles Wall's profile at Collingwood Forever

1895 births
1965 deaths
Australian rules footballers from Melbourne
Collingwood Football Club players
Australian military personnel of World War I
People from Heidelberg, Victoria
Military personnel from Melbourne